Get Christie Love! is an American crime drama TV series starring Teresa Graves as an undercover African-American female detective which originally aired on ABC from January 22, 1974, until April 5, 1975. The starring television role made Graves the second African-American female lead in a U.S. network drama, after Diahann Carroll in Julia. The series is based on Dorothy Uhnak's crime-thriller novel The Ledger.

Synopsis
Based on the novel The Ledger, the main character "Christie Opara"—a white, New York City police detective—was dropped completely and "Christie Love" emerged. Det. Olga Ford of the NYPD served as the series' Technical Advisor. Get Christie Love! was originally broadcast in January 1974 as an ABC Movie of the Week, inspired by the 1970s hero blaxploitation films such as Tamara Dobson's Cleopatra Jones (1973), and Pam Grier's Coffy (1973) and Foxy Brown  (1974). The title character had a catchphrase; upon apprehending a criminal, Love would declare, "You're under arrest, Sugah!" The film proved a success, and consequently spawned a short-lived television series on the ABC network. 22 episodes were shown from September 11, 1974 – April 5, 1975, featuring Charles Cioffi as Love's supervisor Lt. Matt Reardon, who was later replaced by Jack Kelly as Capt. Arthur Ryan.

Financed on a meager budget and heavily sanitized to conform to Graves' religious morals (she had become a Jehovah's Witness since the making of the pilot, and eventually retired from the entertainment industry to focus on her faith), the series was cancelled after one year. One episode featured many of Graves' former Laugh-In co-stars such as Judy Carne, Jo Anne Worley, and Arte Johnson in particular playing a mad bomber. Another notable guest star was Jaclyn Smith, who appeared in an episode entitled "A Fashion Heist."

Cast
Charles Cioffi played Christie Love's boss for the first 12 episodes of the series (his character was featured from the season premiere until "The Longest Fall") and  Jack Kelly took over for the last 10 (beginning with the episode "The Deadly Sport"). The storyline in the pilot that had Christie having a secret affair with her police captain (played by Harry Guardino) was dropped for the regular series.

 Teresa Graves as Christie Love
 Charles Cioffi as Lieutenant Matt Reardon (12 episodes)
 Jack Kelly as Captain Arthur Ryan (10 episodes)
 Michael Pataki as Sergeant Pete Gallagher, Christie's partner
 Dennis Rucker as Lieutenant Steve Belmont
 Andy Romano as Lieutenant Joe Caruso (Romano played a different character in the pilot for the series).

This list is for the ABC Movie of the Week of January 22, 1974, which served as the pilot for the series: 
 Harry Guardino as Captain Casey Reardon
 Louise Sorel as Helena Varga
 Paul Stevens as Enzo Cortino
 Ron Rifkin as Normand
 Lynne Holmes as Celia Jackson
 Lee Paul as Max Loomis
 Titos Vandis as Spiliolis
 Tracey Roberts as Gwen Fenley
 William Hansen as Dr. Shepard
 Andy Romano as Sergeant Seymour Greenberg
 Davis Roberts as Myron Jones
 Bill Henderson as Sergeant Stoner Martin
 Deborah Dozier as Amy
 Darlene Conley as Virginia

Episodes

Television film pilot (1974)

Season 1 (1974–75)

Syndication/reception
The series has aired in the U.S. on the cable network TV Land in 1997 and on Centric (now known as BET Her) in 2014 as part of the show's 40th anniversary. The show gave the first black woman to serve in a State Police force in the United States, Louise Smith, critical motivation to continue with her chosen career when she faced significant discrimination both in the barracks and on the streets.

Cultural references
 In a scene in Quentin Tarantino's film, Reservoir Dogs (1992), the characters Mr. Pink (Steve Buscemi), Mr. White (Harvey Keitel), Mr. Orange (Tim Roth), and "Nice Guy" Eddie Cabot (Chris Penn), engage in a brief discussion regarding Get Christie Love!.
 In the 2002 Austin Powers movie Austin Powers in Goldmember, the character Foxxy Cleopatra (portrayed by Beyoncé) uses the famous phrase, "You're under arrest, Sugah!"

Reboot
In 2017, producers Courtney Kemp and Vin Diesel became attached to a reboot of the series for ABC, entitled Get Christie Love (without the exclamation point), a co-production between Lionsgate Television and Universal Television, which focused on an African American female CIA agent who leads an elite ops unit. However, ABC later announced that it had decided not to pick the pilot up to series.

See also
Blaxploitation
List of female action heroes

References

External links
 
 Get Christie Love! at The Classic TV Archive
 
 
  Top 10 Kick-Ass TV Divas 

Blaxploitation films
American police detective films
1970s crime thriller films
Films based on American novels
Films based on crime novels
ABC Movie of the Week
1974 television films
1974 films
The Wolper Organization films
Television series by The Wolper Organization
Television series by Universal Television
Television films as pilots
1974 American television series debuts
1975 American television series endings
Fictional portrayals of the Los Angeles Police Department
Films directed by William Graham (director)
1970s English-language films
1970s American films